Marvin Harper (born 1 November 1985) is a South African field hockey player who competed in the 2008 Summer Olympics and 2012 Summer Olympics.

References

External links

1985 births
Living people
South African male field hockey players
Olympic field hockey players of South Africa
Field hockey players at the 2008 Summer Olympics
Field hockey players at the 2012 Summer Olympics
2010 Men's Hockey World Cup players
20th-century South African people
21st-century South African people